Edsel Ford High School is a public high school located in Dearborn, Michigan, USA in Greater Detroit. Edsel Ford, located on Rotunda Drive, near Oakwood, is one of three public high schools in the Dearborn Public Schools (along with Fordson and Dearborn High). Edsel Ford High School was completed in 1955, and the first graduating class was in 1956.

The school's enrollment include members of all of the major ethnic groups within Dearborn.

Extra-curricular activities
T. C. Cameron, author of Metro Detroit's High School Football Rivalries, wrote that Edsel’s athletic rivalry with Dearborn High School "has always been spirited" and that Edsel’s teams "never pass on a chance" to challenge Dearborn High in games.

Fall Sports
Football
Girls Swimming
Boys Soccer
Cross Country
Boys Tennis
Girls Golf
Field Hockey
Cheerleading
Girls Volleyball

Winter Sports
Hockey
Boys Basketball
Girls Basketball
Boys Swimming
Wrestling
Cheerleading

Spring Sports
Girls Soccer
Baseball
Softball
Girls Tennis
Track and Field
Boys Golf

Notable alumni
 Derek Lowe (1991), retired Major League Baseball pitcher
 Dan Enos (1986), Offensive Coordinator at University of Arkansas
 Jim Cummins, retired NHL player
 John Vigilante (2003), professional ice hockey forward
Suzanne Sena, current Onion News anchor, and host of Celebrity Homes on E!
 Stewart Baker, author, lawyer, and government 
 Anthony Curtis (writer), professional gambler, publisher of the Las Vegas Advisor
 Richard J. McNally, Ph.D. (1972) Professor of Psychology, author, Harvard University
 Michael G. Maddocks (1978), Emmy-nominated television producer

References

External links

 Edsel Ford High School web page

Public high schools in Michigan
Educational institutions established in 1955
Education in Dearborn, Michigan
Schools in Wayne County, Michigan
1955 establishments in Michigan